Ukrainian Argentines (Ukrajintsi Arhentyny) are Argentine citizens of Ukrainian descent or Ukraine-born people who reside in Argentina. Ukrainian Argentines are an ethnic minority in Argentina. Estimates of the Ukrainian and/or Ukrainian-descended population range from 300,000 to 470,000 people (the latter figure making Ukrainians up to 1% of the total Argentine population). Many Ukrainian Argentines are of Jewish descent. Currently, the main concentrations of Ukrainians in Argentina are in the Greater Buenos Aires area, with at least 100,000 people of Ukrainian descent, the province of Misiones (the historical heartland of Ukrainian immigration to Argentina), with at least 55,000 Ukrainians, and the province of Chaco with at least 30,000 Ukrainians.  In Misiones Province Ukrainians constitute approximately 9% of the province's total population.  In comparison to Ukrainians in North America, the Ukrainian community in Argentina (as well as in Brazil) tends to be more descended from earlier waves of immigration, is poorer, more rural, has less organizational strength, and is more focused on the Church as the center of cultural identity. Most Ukrainian Argentines do not speak the Ukrainian language and have switched to Spanish, although they continue to maintain their ethnic identity.

History

There were four waves of Ukrainian immigration to Argentina: pre-World War I, with about 10,000 to 14,000 immigrants, post-World War I to World War II, including approximately 50,000, post-World War II, with 5,000 immigrants, and the post-Soviet immigration, which is estimated to number approximately 4,000.

The first wave of Ukrainian immigration to Argentina included 12-14 families from Eastern Galicia (at the time part of Austria-Hungary) in 1897. When the immigrants arrived in the country, the Argentine government sent them to the Misiones Province, where they settled in Apóstoles. Their settlement here was part of the local governor's strategy of building up European immigration in his province as a way of preventing neighboring Brazil's claims on the region. Initially, they struggled with adapting to climatic conditions quite different from those of their native Ukraine, and eventually largely switched to tending crops that were appropriate to their new homes, such as sugar cane, rice, tobacco, and especially yerba mate -an Argentinian beverage similar to the tea- as proper crops. Indeed, the first person to grow tea in the province of Misiones was Volodymyr Hnatiuk, a Ukrainian immigrant. Ultimately, at least 10,000 Ukrainians from Galicia settled in Misiones before the onset of World War I.  At this time, an estimated 4,000 Ukrainians also settled in Buenos Aires.

The largest number of Ukrainians migrated to Argentina between the two world wars.  This wave of emigrants, whose number is estimated at between 50,000 and 70,000 people, was much more geographically diverse, and included many people from Orthodox areas of Ukraine such as Volhynia and Bukovina.  It also included more educated or politically oriented people who had been involved in Ukraine's struggle for independence.  Approximately half of this wave of immigrants settled in Buenos Aires, while the remainder strengthened the Ukrainian population in Misiones Province or created new Ukrainian settlements in other agricultural regions such as in Chaco Province.

Approximately 5,000-6,000 Ukrainians fleeing Communism entered Argentina between 1946 and 1950.  Many of them were university professors, military personnel, skilled workers, or technicians. Some of these educated immigrants contributed to the Argentine government's industrialization policies.

An estimated 3,000 highly educated Ukrainians, many from the third wave, left Argentina for the United States or Canada in the 1950s due to greater economic opportunities.  Another 3,000 Ukrainians left Argentina for the Soviet Union during the late 1950s, after having been promised a "prosperous life in the homeland."  Only a third of the latter group were able to return to Argentina.  These demographic losses were compensated for by small numbers of Ukrainians moving to Argentina from Paraguay and Uruguay.

Following the fall of the Soviet Union, since the 1990s approximately 4,000 Ukrainians have moved to Argentina from Ukraine. Although not as numerous as in the past, the Ukrainian immigration is still present.

Society

Religion

Ukrainian Catholics

The first Ukrainians to Argentina who settled in Misiones came from a predominantly Catholic region of Ukraine, Galicia.  However, the local Argentine (Latin Rite) Roman Catholic Church opposed the creation of a separate Ukrainian Catholic Church.  As a result, for the first ten years of their settlement, Argentine Ukrainians Catholics did not have their own Eastern-rite Catholic priests, and were subject to intense missionary activities by Polish Roman Catholics.  In response, many of them converted to Eastern Orthodoxy, whose rituals are virtually identical to those of Ukrainian Catholicism.  Without the help of their Mother Church in Galicia, local Ukrainians built their own churches, chapels, and homes for priests, and petitioned church authorities in Galicia to send priests to them.  Finally, in 1908, Father K. Bzhukhovsky was sent to Misiones from Brazil.  He was succeeded in the province of Misiones by several more priests from Ukraine.  In 1922, the Ukrainian parishes in Misiones were visited by the head of the Ukrainian Catholic Church, Metropolitan Andrey Sheptytsky of Lviv.  The first Ukrainian Catholic Church in Buenos Aires region was built in 1940 and in the city in 1948.  In 1978, the Ukrainian Catholic Church in Argentina was granted its own Eparchy (Eastern-rite equivalent of a diocese).  Andriy Sapeliak was the first Ukrainian Bishop in Argentina.

Currently, over 120,000 of Ukrainians in Argentina are Ukrainian Catholics, comprising approximately 50% of Ukrainian Argentines.  Misiones Province, the heartland of Ukrainian immigration to Argentina, has 60 Ukrainian Catholic Churches and chapels.  In April 1987 Pope John Paul II visited the Ukrainian Catholic community in Buenos Aires.

Orthodox

The first Orthodox Ukrainians in Argentina were converts from the Ukrainian Catholic Church and came under the jurisdiction of the Russian Orthodox Church.  Many Orthodox immigrants who came to Argentina from Ukraine between the World Wars, among whom were several priests, who created parishes in Buenos Aires and surrounding areas.  The newcomers generally belonged to the Ukrainian Autocephalous Orthodox Church.

Approximately 30% of Ukrainian Argentines are currently Orthodox.

Others

The first Protestant Ukrainians were Baptists who emigrated to Argentina from Volyn in the 1920s.  During the period when there was no Ukrainian Church in Argentina, many Ukrainians became accustomed to not being involved in any Church and did not return to their ancestral religion when the parishes were established.

Currently, 20% of Argentine Ukrainians are Protestant or indifferent to religion.

Education

Ukrainian all-day elementary and secondary schools, in which classes are taught in Spanish and follow the Argentine curriculum but also have Ukrainian subjects several times per week, exist in the cities of Apóstoles, Posadas, and Buenos Aires.  Ukrainian all-day elementary schools exist in Berisso and San Vicente (both towns in the Buenos Aires region).  These schools are all run by the Ukrainian Catholic Church.  In addition, Argentina's branch of the Prosvita operates Ukrainian Saturday schools.

Argentina's Ukrainian community also has several folk dancing ensembles, as well as the Ukrainian scouting organization Plast.

Notable Ukrainian Argentines

 Héctor Babenco (film director)
 Gustavo Blanco Leschuk (football player)
 José Chatruc (football player)
 Adabel Guerrero (dancer, actress)
 Olga Gurski (artist)
 Mariano Konyk (football player)
 Boris Kriukow (artist)
 Denis Margalik (figure skater)
 Nadia Podoroska (tennis player)
 Noel Schajris (singer-songwriter and pianist)
 Horacio Spasiuk (musician)
 Vladimiro Tarnawski (footballer)

See also
 Argentina–Ukraine relations
 Eparchy of Santa María del Patrocinio en Buenos Aires

References

External links
 Plast, Ukrainian Scouting Organization, of Argentina

European Argentine
 
Immigration to Argentina
Argentina